Everybody Friends Now is the debut album by Singing Adams and was released by London indie label Records Records Records records in 2011.

Track listing

References

2011 debut albums